Avalon School District is a community public school district that serves students in pre-kindergarten through eighth grade from Avalon, New Jersey, United States. Based on data from the 2014 Taxpayers' Guide to Education Spending prepared by the New Jersey Department of Education, the Avalon district's total per pupil spending of $43,775 was the highest of any regular school district.

Starting with the 2011-12 school year, in an agreement with the Stone Harbor School District, public school students in grades K-4 from both communities attend school at Stone Harbor Elementary School in Stone Harbor while all students in PreK and in grades 5-8 attend school in Avalon as part of a reciprocal sending/receiving relationship.

As of the 2018–19 school year, the district, comprising one school, had an enrollment of 61 students and 13.8 classroom teachers (on an FTE basis), for a student–teacher ratio of 4.4:1. In the 2016–17 school year, Avalon had the smallest enrollment of any school district in the state, with 43 students.

The district is classified by the New Jersey Department of Education as being in District Factor Group "FG", the fourth-highest of eight groupings. District Factor Groups organize districts statewide to allow comparison by common socioeconomic characteristics of the local districts. From lowest socioeconomic status to highest, the categories are A, B, CD, DE, FG, GH, I and J.

Students in public school for ninth through twelfth grades attend Middle Township High School in Cape May Court House, as part of a sending/receiving relationship with the Middle Township Public Schools, together with students from Avalon, Dennis Township, Stone Harbor and Woodbine. As of the 2018–19 school year, the high school had an enrollment of 767 students and 64.6 classroom teachers (on an FTE basis), for a student–teacher ratio of 11.9:1.

Operations
The Avalon and Stone Harbor school districts operate like a single school district even though they are legally two separate districts; they can move teachers between the two schools. In terms of their student populations both districts having among the lowest numbers in New Jersey.

In 2017 Avalon School District was the New Jersey school district with the smallest student population.

Curriculum
The student sharing agreement means the Avalon and Stone Harbor districts retain foreign language and extracurricular programs they would not otherwise have.

Schools
Avalon Elementary School had an enrollment of 61 students in the 2018–19 school year in PreK and grades 5-8.
The school has a ceramic kiln for its art room and an outdoor track which non-school individuals may use. It shares space with the Avalon Public Library. In 2016 the school had 60 students. About 40% of the combined Avalon and Stone Harbor students were from out of district and paid tuition, with many coming from the Cape May Courthouse area.

Administration
Core members of the district's administration are:
Stacey Tracy, Superintendent
Linda Fiori, Business Administrator / Board Secretary

Board of education
The district's board of education, with five members, sets policy and oversees the fiscal and educational operation of the district through its administration. As a Type II school district, the board's trustees are elected directly by voters to serve three-year terms of office on a staggered basis, with either one or two seats up for election each year held (since 2012) as part of the November general election. The board appoints a superintendent to oversee the day-to-day operation of the district.

References

External links
Avalon Elementary School - Avalon/Stone Harbor Schools

 
School Data for the Avalon Elementary School, National Center for Education Statistics

Avalon, New Jersey
New Jersey District Factor Group FG
School districts in Cape May County, New Jersey
Public middle schools in New Jersey
Public K–8 schools in New Jersey
Schools in Cape May County, New Jersey